Richmond City Council may refer to:

 Richmond, British Columbia City Council, Canada
 Richmond, California City Council, United States
 Richmond, Virginia City Council, United States